The CIL Reghin RG-9 Albatros was a tandem seat, all wood glider designed and produced in small numbers at the CIL (Complexu Industrializare Lemnului - Reghin) in Romania in the 1950s.

Design and development

The Albatros was a wooden glider with a cantilever mid-set wing.  The wings had a root chord of 1.60 m (5 ft 3 in), tapering to 0.66 m (2 ft 2 in) at the tip and carried 1.50° of dihedral. They were built around a single spar with a plywood covered leading edge torsion box in front of it and fabric covered behind.  The wing carried wooden, fabric covered ailerons and airbrakes.

The fuselage  of the Albatros was a plywood monocoque and the empennage was also wooden and fabric covered, with the tailplane set at the top of the fuselage.  The occupants sat in tandem under a continuous canopy with two separately sideways opening sections. It had a fixed undercarriage with two wheels on a short axle under the fuselage and an integral nose skid.  At rest, it sat on its wheels and tail.

The Albatros first flew on 1 June 1958.  In all, 25 were built.

Specifications

References

1950s Romanian sailplanes
Reghin